Damarri Deshon Mathis  (born April 12, 1999) is an American football cornerback for the Denver Broncos of the National Football League (NFL). He played college football at Pittsburgh.

Early life and high school
Mathis grew up in Lakeland, Florida and attended Lakeland Senior High School. Mathis was rated a three-star recruit and initially committed to play college football at South Carolina. He later decommitted from South Carolina and signed to play at Pittsburgh.

College career
Mathis played in nine games as a freshman, appearing mostly on special teams. Mathis played in all 13 of Pittsburgh's games with 10 starts in his junior season and recorded 23 tackles 23 tackles with 11 passes broken up and two interceptions. He suffered a non-football related shoulder injury prior to his senior season and used a medical redshirt. In his fifth season, Mathis played in 13 games and had 44 tackles, with six passes broken up and two interceptions, one of which he returned for a touchdown, and was named honorable mention All-Atlantic Coast Conference.  After the conclusion of his college career, he played in the 2022 Senior Bowl.

Professional career

Mathis was drafted by the Denver Broncos in the fourth round, 115th overall, of the 2022 NFL Draft.

References

External links
Denver Broncos bio
Pittsburgh Panthers bio

1999 births
Living people
Players of American football from Florida
Sportspeople from Lakeland, Florida
American football cornerbacks
Pittsburgh Panthers football players
Denver Broncos players